George Wallace Lyle (born November 24, 1953) is a Canadian former professional ice hockey player. Between 1976 and 1983 he played 99 games in the National Hockey League with the Detroit Red Wings and Hartford Whalers, as well as 202 games in the World Hockey Association with the New England Whalers.

Playing career
Lyle was selected 123rd overall in 1973 after transferring to Michigan Tech.  He then spent three years at Michigan Tech where they were NCAA Champions in 1975 and runner up in both 1974 and 1976 NCAA tournament. In 1975-76 he was placed on the WCHA first all-star team and earned All-American honors after scoring 47 goals in 43 games during the 1975–76 schedule.

Lyle opted to begin his pro career with the WHA's New England Whalers in 1976–77. After scoring 39 goals for the club [team record] he was presented the Lou Kaplan Trophy as the league's top rookie. He continued to be a solid worker for another two seasons before the Detroit Red Wings reclaimed him as a part of the 1979 NHL Expansion Draft. He split the next two seasons between the NHL and the AHL's Adirondack Red Wings. In 1981 he scored 18 points in as many playoff games when he helped the Wings capture the Calder Cup.

After a slow start in 1981–82, Lyle was placed on waivers and picked up by Hartford. He averaged a point per game in 14 contests for his new club before sustaining a season ending eye injury. The veteran scorer retired in 1983 after playing 16 games for Hartford and spending the rest of his time with the Binghamton Whalers of the AHL.

Career statistics

Regular season and playoffs

Awards and honours

References

External links 
 
 Hockey Draft Central

1953 births
Living people
Adirondack Red Wings players
Binghamton Whalers players
Canadian ice hockey forwards
Detroit Red Wings draft picks
Detroit Red Wings players
Hartford Whalers players
Ice hockey people from British Columbia
Michigan Tech Huskies men's ice hockey players
NCAA men's ice hockey national champions
New England Whalers players
Sportspeople from North Vancouver
Springfield Indians players